Johannes Tørrissen Worum (4 June 1817 – 20 December 1889) was a Norwegian politician.

He was born at Ytterøy in Nord-Trondelag. His father was Tørris Johnsen Worum (1784-1836).
He worked as a teacher and was elected to the Norwegian Parliament in 1854 and 1859, representing the constituency of Nordre Throndhjems Amt (now Nord-Trondelag).

References

1817 births
1889 deaths
Members of the Storting
Politicians from Nord-Trøndelag